Two Cheers for Democracy is the second collection of essays by E. M. Forster, published in 1951, and incorporating material from 1936 onwards. The humorous title is not directly connected with the essays themselves and, according to the preface, was suggested to him by one of his "younger friends... as a joke."

Reflecting Forster's increasing politicisation in the 1930s, particularly in the first section entitled 'The Second Darkness', the collection contains versions of his anti-Nazi broadcasts of 1940, as well as his defence of individualism as "a liberal who has found liberalism crumbling beneath him" in the face of the rise of totalitarianism.

Themes
The collection was arranged thematically, not chronologically, with the political first section followed by a second, more cultural part, 'What I Believe', containing Forster's reflection on art in general, as well as on particular artists ranging from John Skelton to Syed Ross Masood.

Part One saw Forster struggling to articulate his quiet liberalism, and his concern for the individual, in the face not only of continental totalitarianism, but also of both right-wing xenophobia and left-wing extremism at home. The book's title comes from the end of the sixth paragraph of "What I Believe" (http://spichtinger.net/otexts/believe.html). Seen widely as out-of-step and ineffective at the time, his writings have perhaps worn better than many of their more strident counterparts--Stanley Cavell for example praising him a half-century later for the honesty of his concrete efforts to weigh up the competing ethical claims of public and private spheres, country and friends.

In Part Two, Forster both enunciated and exemplified his belief in the arts and culture as an (inner) ordering principle in life - providing it with a celebratory sense of meaning. As he himself put it, ”I have found by experience that the arts act as an antidote against our present troubles, and also as a support to our common humanity.”

See also

References

External links
 Two Cheers for Democracy

Books by E. M. Forster